Bailey Fountain is an outdoor sculpture in New York City at the site of three 19th century fountains in Grand Army Plaza, Brooklyn, New York, United States. Renovated in 1956 and 2005-06, the 1932 fountain was funded by philanthropist Frank Bailey as a memorial to his wife Mary Louise Bailey.  After 1974 thefts, some sculpture elements were stored for safekeeping. The bronze Art Deco design of the Bailey Fountain consists of six monumental figures beginning with the top two, a man representing Wisdom with his left hand on the tiller steering the ship of Life and a woman representing Felicity with her right hand holding a cornucopia. Below them are two other statues, one a chubby standing child helping to shoulder that cornucopia while the second is a laughing Greek mythological figure called Nereus who is the eldest son of Pontus the Sea and Gaia the Earth. To the sides of the fountain are the two remaining aquatic Nereides / sea nymph figures with upper torsos emerging from the water their heads back trumpeting with conch shells as their fish tails twist in the background.

Fountain of the Golden Spray

The Fountain of the Golden Spray of 1867 with a single jet of water was part of the 1867 Grand Army Plaza design.

Dome fountain 

The 1873 dome fountain by Calvert Vaux replaced the 1867 fountain with a two-tiered, double-domed structure of cast iron and molded sections of Beton Coignet. Gaslights in the 37.2 foot (11.4 m) diameter dome were visible through one of 24 colored glass windows . Additional gaslights mounted in the guardrail illuminated the surface of the pool.  The Brooklyn Mayor criticized the water use of the fountain which could pump 60,000 gallons an hour, and by the 1890s the fountain leaked and was frequently dry. A boy drowned in the fountain in June 1895.

Electric Fountain 

The 1897  replaced the 1873 fountain and was controlled by 2 operators during scheduled night exhibitions on Wednesdays and Saturdays with audiences up to 30,000. A Brooklyn Park Commissioner's initial plan for a single spout was superseded by Fredric W. Darlington's design, which was presented in May 1897 to the Park Commission.  Wilson & Baillie Manufacturing built the fountain, and the commission's "consulting engineer" was C. C. Martin.  Landscape architect Frederick Law Olmsted placed the fountain at the intersection of two broad paths arranged as a Georgian cross within grassy, treeless plots at the quadrants. The "first exhibition" contracted for July 4, 1897, was delayed until August 7 and attended by "fully 100,000 people".  

The 6,000 candela "automatic focusing arc lamps" were wired in 3 series circuits for dimming, could each be moved  within "silver parabolic reflectors" to narrow or widen the 19 beams, and were positioned in concentric rings around a central light. The lights extended into glass cylinders protruding through the underwater ceiling and were each beamed through switchable disks of colored gels into water jets (there was also a lighted central geyser). The ~2,000 nozzles included umbrellas, ball sprays, wheat sheaves, rings, fans, funnels and whirligigs; with many of the nozzles around the lamp housings. A pump recirculated up to 100,000 gallons per hour from the pool in the  basin. The fountain also had 88 incandescent lamps on the inner edge of the basin's concrete coping, and the Brooklyn Heights and the Nassau Electric railroads donated the electricity.

The 1915 construction of the New York City Subway's IRT Eastern Parkway Line and BMT Brighton Line under the plaza left no room for the required infrastructure for the Electric Fountain, which was removed.

References

1932 sculptures
Bronze sculptures in Brooklyn
Buildings and structures completed in 1932
Fountains in New York City
Nude sculptures in New York (state)
Outdoor sculptures in Brooklyn
Grand Army Plaza
Prospect Park (Brooklyn)
Sculptures of men in New York City
Sculptures of women in New York City
Statues in New York City